Allahabad-e Bala (also Romanized as Allahābād-e Bālā) is a village in Karvandar Rural District, in the Central District of Khash County, Sistan and Baluchestan Province, Iran. At the 2006 census, its population was 33, in 8 families.

References 

Populated places in Khash County